Thoopara is a rural locality in the Whitsunday Region, Queensland, Australia.

Geography
The Andromache River forms the southern boundary of Thoopara as it flows east to join the O'Connell River, which then forms the south-eastern boundary. The Bruce Highway crosses the O'Connell River at the Thoopara / Lethebrook / Bloomsbury tripoint and runs north to form the eastern boundary.

The North Coast railway line passes through the centre of the locality from south to north . The former Thoopara railway station is the location of a passing loop.

References 

Whitsunday Region
Localities in Queensland